Danielle Caruana, known professionally as Mama Kin, is an Australian singer-songwriter. She has released two albums, Beat and Holler and The Magician's Daughter. She lives with her family in Fremantle.

Early life
Caruana grew up in the Melbourne suburb of Newport, the youngest, by some years, of six siblings by parents of Maltese extraction. The family was musical and she studied classical piano from the age of five to 16. Every child in the family was expected to play an instrument and to play in the family band in church and for members of the Maltese community who visited their house. Her strongest musical influence was her sister Carmen, 14 years older, with whom she sang and who taught her to harmonise, and who introduced her to lasting musical influences: blues and gospel, Aretha Franklin, Nina Simone, the Pretenders and Joan Armatrading. Other family influences were country, Jerry Lee Lewis, Johnny Cash, Dolly Parton, Ray Charles, Elvis Presley, the crooners, Stevie Wonder, Dr John, The Cure, The Police, Prince and Michael Jackson. Caruana says, "I loved all of it, because my brothers and sisters were into it. I couldn't imagine a life without music", but also that the musicality of her family inhibited her own career: "I was completely petrified. After having grown up under two really incredibly, incredibly diverse musical brothers and a really musical family, I think I just made a decision really early on that I wasn't good enough, that I wasn't as good as them."

Career
Caruana first started writing songs in 2006. Prior to her solo career, she provided vocals on albums by her husband, John Butler. The Mama Kin band came about through playing with her brothers Nicky Bomba and Michael Caruana. The name Mama Kin was given her by Bomba, a former member of the John Butler Trio. Caruana says, "we were toying with the idea of doing a creative project together called Kin. A couple of days into the process I found out I was pregnant with my second child and he called me the Mama Kin." When it stuck as her band name she had not heard of the Aerosmith song. Caruana, her brother Michael on keyboards and drummer George Servanis are the principal members of the Mama Kin ensemble.

Mama Kin's first released recording was an EP, Papoose in 2008, followed by a single, "Tore My Heart Out", released in 2009. Her debut album, Beat and Holler, written almost entirely on an old Wurlitzer organ and recorded at The Compound, Fremantle and released in 2009. Of the album Caruana has said, "In almost every song, although it might sound like I'm talking about a partner, I'm generally talking about a part of myself." Beat and Holler was nominated for Best Blues and Roots Album at the AIR Awards of 2010.

Caruana's second album, The Magician's Daughter, was released on 22 February 2013. It is named after her mother, an actual magician's daughter. Caruana's grandfather worked as a professional magician in post-World War II Malta, and her mother, Iris, was one of his assistants. The album was written mostly from home and recorded at The Compound. It was produced by Jan Skubiszewski. 

The Magician's Daughter was nominated for ARIA Award for Best Blues and Roots Album at the [[ARIA Music Awards of 2013.

Caruna joined with Tommy Spender from Offcutts to form Mama Kin Spender and they released the album Golden Magnetic in 2018. Golden Magnetic was nominated for an ARIA Award for Best Blues & Roots Album at the ARIA Music Awards of 2018.

Philanthropy
Caruana contributes to philanthropic activities in the fields of indigenous and environmental rights.

In February 2011 John Butler and Caruana performed as Brave and the Bird at the annual Gimme Shelter fundraising event for the homeless at the Fremantle Arts Centre, their set introduced by Kevin Rudd.

The Seed Fund, originally the JB Seed Fund, was set up in 2005 by Butler, Caruana and others with an initial donation of A$80,000, to help artists and musicians become self-sustained. Its flagship project is the Management Workshop, in which 25 emerging managers have three days of workshops with experienced industry managers of internationally known Australian bands. Caruana says the main motivation behind creating the organisation is to create community within the music industry.

Personal life
Caruana met John Butler in Fremantle, Western Australia and they were married in Broome in 1999. Their home is in Fremantle. They have a daughter, Banjo, and a son, Jahli. Both children play music and Caruana credits having them, along with the Seed Fund, with starting her musical career. Of her musical relationship with her husband, she has said, "I love and respect his opinion, but we definitely have different tastes in music." Prior to beginning her solo musical career Caruana suffered from depression, an experience that has informed her songwriting and which she ascribes to her suppression of her musicality. She reports that one of her biggest discoveries was Transcendental Meditation and that, "When I first started this practice I remember thinking 'Oh, this is what sanity must feel like.'"

The John Butler Trio song "Daniella", from the group's 2007 album Grand National, is about Caruana.

Discography

Studio albums

EPs

Awards and nominations

AIR Awards
The Australian Independent Record Awards (commonly known informally as AIR Awards) is an annual awards night to recognise, promote and celebrate the success of Australia's Independent Music sector.

|-
| AIR Awards of 2010
|Beat and Holler 
| Best Blues and Roots Album
| 
|-
| AIR Awards of 2013
|The Magician's Daughter 
| Best Blues and Roots Album
| 
|-

ARIA Music Awards
The ARIA Music Awards is an annual awards ceremony that recognises excellence, innovation, and achievement across all genres of Australian music. 

! Lost to
|-
| 2013
| The Magician's Daughter
| Best Blues & Roots Album
| 
| Russell Morris - Sharkmouth
|-
| 2018
| Golden Magnetic (as Mama Kin Spender)
| Best Blues & Roots Album
| 
| Tash Sultana - Flow State
|-

West Australian Music Industry Awards
The West Australian Music Industry Awards (WAMIs) are annual awards presented to the local contemporary music industry, put on annually by the Western Australian Music Industry Association Inc (WAM).
 
 (wins only)
|-
| 2013
| Mama Kin
| Best Folk Act 
| 
|-
| 2018
| Mama Kin Spender
| Best Blues / Roots Act 
| 
|-

References

External links

The Seed Fund website
 
Family background
Video interview on The Magician's Daughter

Australian singer-songwriters
Living people
Musicians from Western Australia
People from Fremantle
Musicians from Melbourne
Year of birth missing (living people)
Australian ukulele players